Melzar John Williams (November 11, 1913 – May 13, 2000) was an American Negro league outfielder in the 1930s.

A native of Mobile, Alabama, Williams played for the Birmingham Black Barons in 1937 and 1938. In 40 recorded games, he batted .278 with a home run and 25 RBI. Williams died in Charlotte, North Carolina in 2000 at age 86.

References

External links
 and Seamheads

1913 births
2000 deaths
Birmingham Black Barons players
Baseball outfielders
Baseball players from Alabama
Sportspeople from Mobile, Alabama
20th-century African-American sportspeople